The Hannoversche Gesellschaft für Neue Musik (HGNM) also "Gesellschaft für Neue Musik" is a publisher based in Hanover specializing in Neue Musik.

History and activities 
The association was founded on 31 January 1987 in Hanover. The aim of the association is the promotion and communication of Neue Musik.

The Hannoversche Gesellschaft für Neue Musik organises concerts and premieres of neue musik, organises international composition competitions and commissions compositions. It has organised music festivals, including the Biennale Neue Musik Hannover, ein Glockenkonzert zum 30. Evangelischen Kirchentag 2005 and the festival für neue musik.

The association produced numerous introductions to works and documentaries. Since 1987, it has published the journal Noten und Notizen: Zeitschrift der Hannoverschen Gesellschaft für Neue Musik e.V..

Publication 
 Hinrich Bergmeier, Anke Sonnek: Elliott Carter. Eine Hommage, Springe: HGNM, 1991

References

External links 
 
 

Hanover
Publishing companies of Germany
1987 establishments in West Germany